William "Murray" Ryan (July 22, 1922 – January 7, 2017) was an American politician who was a Republican member of the New Mexico House of Representatives from 1969 to 1999.

Early life and education
He attended Western High School. He attended New Mexico State Teachers College and then graduated from the United States Military Academy in 1945. Ryan then served in the United States Army where he was stationed in German until 1948 and Fort Lewis, Washington until 1949.

Career
He was a businessman and worked in his family's liquor. Ryan also served on the local school board.

Later life
Ryan is buried at Memory Lane Cemetery, Silver City, New Mexico next to his wife Marian.

References

1922 births
2017 deaths
People from Grant County, New Mexico
United States Military Academy alumni
Western New Mexico University alumni
Businesspeople from New Mexico
School board members in New Mexico
Republican Party members of the New Mexico House of Representatives
People from Silver City, New Mexico
20th-century American businesspeople
United States Army officers